Andrea Faustini (born 17 June 1994) is an Italian singer. He is best known for his role as a contestant on the eleventh series of The X Factor in 2014. In 2015, Faustini released his debut studio album, Kelly, which peaked at number 14 on the UK Albums Chart.

Career

2008: Ti lascio una canzone
In 2008, at the age of 13, Faustini appeared on the Italian show Ti Lascio Una Canzone (Leaving You a Song).

2012: First single
On January that year, Andrea published "Per me e per te" written by Mariella Nava. Produced by Cantieri Sonori. The song and music videoclip are released in Italian.

2014: The X Factor
Faustini, who sang The Jackson 5's "Who's Lovin' You" for his first audition was well received by the four judges present that day. Simon Cowell even commented that Faustini "could be really special" in the competition, before receiving a "yes" from all of the judges. Faustini was part of the 114 other acts who successfully got through the Arena Auditions at the SSE Arena in London that year. Together with other male contestants up to the ages of 25, he was later placed into the "Boys" category, mentored by Mel B. Faustini got through the "six-chair challenge" during bootcamp, replacing Hayden Leeman, who had initially been given a seat for his rendition of Joan Jett's "I Love Rock 'n' Roll". Faustini's performance of Whitney Houston's "I Didn't Know My Own Strength" during bootcamp moved judges Mel B and Cheryl Fernandez-Versini to tears as well as earned him praises from Louis Walsh and Cowell. For judges' houses, Mel B brought the "Boys" category to Cancún where Faustini performed Jennifer Hudson's "And I Am Telling You I'm Not Going" for her and fellow Spice Girls member Emma Bunton. Faustini was one of the four finalists selected to perform at the live shows which began on 11 October 2014.

Faustini performed Michael Jackson's "Earth Song" for the first live show, and quickly became the bookies' favourite to win the show. He was in the bottom two in week 7 with Stevi Ritchie and was saved after Mel B, Fernandez-Versini and Walsh voted to send Faustini through to the quarter-final and Cowell voted to send Ritchie through to the quarter-final. However voting statistics revealed that Ritchie received more votes than Faustini meaning if Walsh sent the result to deadlock, Ritchie would've advanced to the quarter-final and Faustini would've been eliminated. Faustini was once again in the Final Showdown in the semi-final with Lauren Platt, but was saved again when Mel B, Walsh and Cowell voted to send Faustini through to the final with only Fernandez-Versini voting to send Platt through to the final. However, once again, voting statistics revealed that Faustini received the fewest public votes meaning if there was not a Final Showdown, or if Cowell had sent the result to deadlock, Platt would've advanced to the final and Faustini would've been eliminated. Faustini ended up finishing third, behind runner-up Fleur East and winner Ben Haenow.

2015: Kelly
22 February 2015 it was announced that Faustini had signed a record deal with RCA Records and would be going to Los Angeles and Tamworth to record his debut album at Ventura Park Matatlan, due for release later in 2015 His debut album Kelly was released on 17 July 2015.

Mister Felicitá
Andrea takes part in the original soundtrack written by Umberto Gary Scipione (music and lyrics), singing the two original songs,
"Our nights" and "Rhapsody", for the Italian film "Mister Felicità".

Discography

Albums

Singles

Soundtracks
 "Our nights" for Mister Felicità (2017)
 "Rhapsody" for the film Mister Felicità (2017)

Music videoclips 
 Per me e per te
 Give a little love

References

Living people
The X Factor (British TV series) contestants
1994 births